Evgenia Dodina (born 10 December 1964) is an Israeli actress of Belarusian origin. She has appeared in more than thirty films since 1987.

Selected filmography

References

External links 

1964 births
Living people
Israeli film actresses
People from Mogilev